Colombia competed at the 2019 World Aquatics Championships in Gwangju, South Korea from 12 to 28 July.

Artistic swimming

Colombia's artistic swimming team consisted of 4 athletes (3 female and 1 male).

Women

Mixed

Diving

Colombia entered eight divers.

Men

Women

Mixed

High diving

Colombia qualified two male and one female high divers.

Men

Women

Swimming

Colombia has entered six swimmers.

Men

Women

References

World Aquatics Championships
2019
Nations at the 2019 World Aquatics Championships